Ianussiusa is a monotypic butterfly genus in the family Nymphalidae. It contains only one species, Ianussiusa maso, which is found in Colombia and Venezuela.

References

Butterflies described in 1905
Satyrini
Monotypic butterfly genera